Peterandresenite is a very rare mineral, the first known natural hexaniobate. Its chemical formula is Mn4Nb6O19•14H2O. Its structure contains a special type of octahedron: Lindqvist ion. Peterandresenite was found in a pegmatite of the Larvik complex in Norway. It is somewhat similar to other unique niobium minerals, aspedamite and menezesite.

Occurrence
Peterandresenite was discovered in AS Granit quarry, Tvedalen, Larvik, Vestfold, Norway.

References

Niobium minerals
Manganese(II) minerals
Oxide minerals
Monoclinic minerals
Minerals in space group 12